Allen J. Frances (born 2 October 1942) is an American psychiatrist. He is currently Professor and Chairman Emeritus of the Department of Psychiatry and Behavioral Sciences at Duke University School of Medicine. He is best known for serving as chair of the American Psychiatric Association task force overseeing the development and revision of the fourth edition of the Diagnostic and Statistical Manual of Mental Disorders (DSM-IV). Frances is the founding editor of two well-known psychiatric journals: the Journal of Personality Disorders and the Journal of Psychiatric Practice.

During the development of the current diagnostic manual, DSM-5, Frances became critical of the expanding boundaries of psychiatry and the medicalization of normal human behavior, problems he contends are leading to the overdiagnosis and overtreatment of the "worried well" and the gross undertreatment of the severely ill. In recent years, Frances has become a vocal advocate for improved treatment and societal conditions for the seriously mentally ill, the appropriate use of electroconvulsive therapy in severe cases of mental disorder, and an integrated, biopsychosocial approach to psychiatry.

Frances is the author or co-author of multiple books within the fields of psychiatry and psychology, including: Differential Therapeutics (1984), Your Mental Health (1999), Saving Normal (2013), Essentials of Psychiatric Diagnosis (2013), and Twilight of American Sanity (2017).

Education and career

Education
Frances was born and raised in New York City, US. He received his bachelor's degree from Columbia College in 1963 and his medical degree in 1967 from SUNY Downstate College of Medicine. He graduated from the psychiatry residency training program at the New York State Psychiatric Institute in 1971 and received a certificate in psychoanalytic medicine from Columbia University Center for Psychoanalytic Training and Research in 1978. His research in the fields of psychiatry and behavioral sciences focused on schizophrenia, personality disorders, anxiety disorders, mood disorders, and clinical treatment of psychiatric patients.

Career
Frances' early career was spent at Cornell University Medical College, where he rose to the rank of professor, headed the outpatient department, saw patients, taught, established a brief therapy program, and developed research specialty clinics for schizophrenia, depression, anxiety disorders, and AIDS. Throughout his academic career, Frances was an active investigator and prolific author in a surprisingly wide range of clinical areas including personality disorders, chronic depression, anxiety disorders, schizophrenia, AIDS, and psychotherapy. In 1991, he became chairman of the Department of Psychiatry at Duke University School of Medicine, where he helped to expand the research, training, and clinical programs that had been initiated by his predecessor as chair, Dr. Bernard Carroll.

Publications
Frances' book on Differential Therapeutics (1984) tried to bring specificity and evidence to decisions on how best to match patient and treatment. His recognition of therapeutic limits resulted in the 1981 paper No Treatment as the Prescription of Choice. Frances was the founding editor of two journals that have become standards: The Journal of Personality Disorders and the Journal of Psychiatric Practice.

In 2013, Allen Frances wrote a paper entitled "The New Crisis of Confidence in Psychiatric Diagnosis", which said that "psychiatric diagnosis still relies exclusively on fallible subjective judgments rather than objective biological tests". Frances was also concerned about "unpredictable overdiagnosis".

The Diagnostic and Statistical Manual of Mental Disorders

DSM-5
The next revision DSM-5 was initiated with a 2002 book (A Research Agenda for DSM-V) questioning the utility of the atheoretical, descriptive paradigm and suggesting a neuroscience research agenda aiming to develop a pathophysiologically based classification. After a series of symposiums, the task force began to work on the manual itself. In June 2008, Dr. Robert Spitzer who chaired the DSM-III and DSM-IIIR revisions had begun to write about the secrecy of the DSM-V Task Force (DSM-V: Open and Transparent?). Frances initially declined to join Spitzer's criticism, but after learning about the changes being considered, he wrote an article in July 2009 (A Warning Sign on the Road to DSM-V: Beware of Its Unintended Consequences) expressing multiple concerns including the unsupported paradigm shift, a failure to specify the level of empirical support needed for changes, their lack of openness, their ignoring the negative consequences of their proposals, a failure to meet timelines, and anticipate the coming time pressures. The APA/DSM-V Task Force response dismissed his complaints.
 
In March 2010, Frances began a weekly blog in Psychology Today, DSM-5 in Distress: The DSM's impact on mental health practice and research, often cross-posted in the Psychiatric Times and the Huffington Post. While many of his blog posts were about the DSM-5 Task Force lowering the thresholds for diagnosing existing disorders (attention deficit disorder, autism, addictions, personality disorders, bipolar II disorder), he was also disturbed by the addition of new speculative disorders (Attenuated Psychosis Syndrome, Disruptive Mood Dysregulation Disorder, Somatic Symptom Disorder). He has argued that the diagnosis attenuated psychosis syndrome promoted by advocates of early intervention for psychosis, such as Australian psychiatrist Patrick McGorry, is risky because of a high rate of inaccuracy, the potential to stigmatize young people given this label, the lack of any effective treatment, and the risk of children and adolescents being given dangerous antipsychotic medication. The elimination of the bereavement exclusion from the diagnosis of major depressive disorder was another particular concern, threatening to label normal grief as a mental illness. So while the task force was focusing on early detection and treatment, Frances cautioned about diagnostic inflation, overmedication, and crossing the boundary of normality. Besides the original complaint that the DSM-5 Task Force was a closed process, Frances pointed out that they were behind schedule and even with a one-year postponement, they had to drop a follow-up quality control step. He recommended further postponement and advocated asking an outside body to review their work to make suggestions. While the American Psychiatric Association did have an internal review, they rejected his suggestion of an external consultation. When the field testing for inter-rater reliability was released in May 2012, several of the more contested disorders were eliminated as unreliable (attenuated psychosis syndrome, mixed anxiety depression) and the reliabilities were generally disappointing. The APA Board of Trustees eliminated a complex "Cross-Cutting" Dimensional System, but many of the contested areas remained when the document was approved for printing in December 2012 for a scheduled release in May 2013. There were widespread threats of a boycott. 
 
Frances's writings were joined by a general criticism of the DSM-5 revision, ultimately resulting in a petition calling for outside review signed by 14,000 and sponsored by 56 mental health organizations. In the course of almost three years of blogging, Frances became a voice for more than just the specifics of the DSM-5. He spoke out against the overuse of psychiatric medications—particularly in children; a general trend towards global diagnostic inflation—pathologizing normality; the intrusion of the pharmaceutical industry into psychiatric practice; and a premature attempt to move psychiatry to an exclusively biological paradigm without scientific justification. Along the way, he wrote two books: Saving Normal: An Insider's Revolt Against Out-of-Control Psychiatric Diagnosis, DSM-5, Big Pharma, and the Medicalization of Ordinary Life (2013), and Essentials of Psychiatric Diagnosis (2013), meant to guide clinicians and to help curb unwarranted diagnostic exuberance. He has decided to continue writing on a new Psychology Today blog called Saving Normal.

Major contentions

Neglecting severe mental illness 
Frances contends that while the deinstitutionalization movement was needed due to hospital overcrowding, frequent civil liberties violations, and poor conditions for hospitalized psychiatric patients, its implementation in the United States was an utter failure. In 2018, he wrote, Frances asserts that psychiatry itself has contributed to the neglect of the severely ill by diverting limited resources away from the community treatment of these patients and focusing instead on genetics research, neuroscience research, and the treatment of the mildly ill. He is particularly critical of NIMH spending excesses in the field of neuroscience, which he says have not helped a single patient in actual life. He is a proponent of a community psychiatry approach.

He argues for the limited and safeguarded use of involuntary psychiatric hospitalization, writing that it is far preferable to the all-too-common alternatives: homelessness and imprisonment.

Overtreating the worried well 
Frances argues that with the gradual expansion of the DSM diagnostic system, psychiatry's attention has shifted away from the severely mentally ill and towards the treatment of the mildly ill or "worried well." This has led to several "false epidemics" of mental disorder, including autism and childhood bipolar disorder. He writes extensively about the pathologization of normal human behavior in his book Saving Normal, and provides guidance to clinicians to avoid these pitfalls in Essentials of Psychiatric Diagnosis. During the DSM-5 revision process, he was particularly critical of the concepts of psychosis risk syndrome, binge eating disorder, and mild neurocognitive disorder.

Controversial treatments 
Frances is a proponent of the safe and appropriate use of electroconvulsive therapy in severe and treatment-resistant cases of mental disorder; the use of lithium therapy for bipolar disorder; and the use of clozapine for schizophrenia. Regarding electroconvulsive therapy, Frances argues that the treatment can be lifesaving in cases of severe, unrelenting depression and in some other psychiatric disorders, such as malignant, or lethal, catatonia. He has repeatedly asserted that if he were severely depressed, he would agree to electroconvulsive treatment.

Frances has expressed his belief that both lithium carbonate and clozapine are underutilized in the treatment of bipolar disorder and schizophrenia, respectively, often in favor of newer, more profitable second-generation antipsychotic drugs. The current consensus in global psychiatry is that both lithium and clozapine remain the most effective agents in the treatment of their respective conditions; among academic psychiatrists, their underutilization is widely recognized.

Frances has expressed skepticism over the use of ketamine in the treatment of clinical depression, writing that even if it is narrowly indicated in treatment-resistant mood disorder, "ketamine promotionals will encourage many people to start using it as self-medication for distress–a practice that is filled with risk and falls far outside any possible reasonable use of ketamine."

On psychotherapy and psychoanalysis 
Trained as a psychoanalyst, Frances taught the Freud course at the Columbia Psychoanalytic Center for a decade starting in the late 1970s. He has said that his "favorite work activity throughout [his] career was doing and teaching psychodynamic psychotherapy." Some of his early work was on the study and treatment of personality disorder.

Frances contends that guild wars within psychotherapy have hurt the profession and those it treats; like Marvin Goldfried, he is a proponent of psychotherapy integration. He has said that the biggest mistake made by American psychoanalysis was their rejection of Aaron Beck's cognitive behavior therapy. Regarding Freud, Frances has said that Freud was "overvalued in his day and is now undervalued in ours."

Biopsychosocial model 
Frances is a proponent of George Engel's biopsychosocial model of mental disorder, writing that the "biopsychosocial model of mental illness and mental health care created a conceptual underpinning of psychiatric practice." Frances is critical of reductionistic theories in psychiatry and psychology; in any mental disorder, biological, psychological, and social factors are working in tandem to create and maintain dysfunction.

Book and statements on Donald Trump

Frances wrote a 2017 book, titled, Twilight of American Sanity, in which he asserts that Trump himself does not have a mental disease, but rather that the problem lies with the American people for selecting him as U.S. President. Frances writes in the book: "Calling Trump crazy allows us to avoid confronting the craziness in our society." The Washington Post gave a book review of Twilight of American Sanity and found the arguments by Frances to stray from medical to political in nature. The book review by Carlos Lozada in The Washington Post concluded: "America is delusional not just because it elected Trump, but because it doesn't conform to Frances's views on climate change, population growth, technology, privacy, war, economics and guns." Publishers Weekly concluded in a book review that Twilight of American Sanity contained factual errors and exaggeration. A book review by Kirkus Reviews was positive, calling the work a "cogent analysis". Kirkus Reviews concluded its book review: "This welcome and insightful book joins a small shelf of essential titles ... that help explain why and how the Trump presidency happened."

On August 25, 2019, in an interview on CNN, Frances stated that Trump may wind up being responsible for millions of deaths and may wind up killing more people than Adolf Hitler, Joseph Stalin and Mao Zedong. Frances was quoted as saying, "Trump is as destructive a person in this century, as Hitler, Stalin, and Mao were in the last century. He may be responsible for many more million deaths than they were. He needs to be contained, but he needs to be contained by attacking his policies, not his person."

Politifact noted that Frances posted a follow-up to Twitter in which he asserted his comments referred to the potential future impact of climate change. Politifact brought forth multiple referenced sources in order to analyze the comments by Frances. Politifact reported that according to Timothy Snyder, Yale University history professor in a 2011 calculation, Adolf Hitler killed over eleven million people during the Holocaust. Politifact noted that the U.S. Holocaust Memorial Museum estimated about 17 million deaths attributed to Hitler during World War II. Politifact cited the book The Souls of China: The Return of Religion After Mao by author Ian Johnson, which found Mao Zedong responsible for approximately 42.5 million fatalities.

Politifact wrote in their analysis: "Not only does Frances' comparison exaggerate the predicted climate change death toll compared to that of the dictators, he also lays the blame for potential future deaths at Trump's feet alone, which even experts critical of Trump consider wrongheaded." Politifact concluded, "We rate the statement Pants on Fire.

Snopes analyzed the assertions by Frances and received a follow-up comment from him, in response to social media backlash to his statements. Frances clarified in his comment to Snopes, that he was referring to the potential future impact of climate change. Frances said in his email to Snopes: "I think it is no exaggeration to worry that the policies that follow from Trump's reckless climate denial may wind up causing the death of hundreds of millions of people. Our species appears to be on a path to self-destruction, and Trump is enthusiastically leading the way."

References

External links
Is Criticism of DSM-5 'Anti-psychiatry'?
The Role of Biological Tests in Psychiatric Diagnosis
 

1942 births
Living people
American psychiatrists
Columbia College (New York) alumni
SUNY Downstate Medical Center alumni
Duke University School of Medicine faculty